Joseph Mifsud (born 1960) is a Maltese academic. In 2016, he became involved with George Papadopoulos, an advisor to the Donald Trump presidential campaign, and was later accused of being a link between that campaign and Russia. In 2018, he was described as missing, and an Italian court listed his location as "residence unknown". According to media reports, he was in Rome as of April 2019.

Education
Mifsud holds a bachelor's degree in education from the University of Malta (1982) and a master's degree in education from the University of Padua (1989). He was awarded a PhD in 1995 from Queen's University Belfast; his thesis was titled Managing Educational Reform: A Comparative Approach from Malta (and Northern Ireland); a Headteachers' Perspective.

Career
Mifsud assisted in the 1999 founding of Link Campus University (a subsidiary of the University of Malta with links to Italian intelligence), who was then the head of the university's education department. Mifsud acted as its "director of international relations".

From 2006 to 2008, Mifsud served as the chef de cabinet of the Ministry of Foreign Affairs of Malta. He later became a principal in the London Centre of International Law Practice (LCILP). In 2008, he was named President of the Euro-Mediterranean University of Slovenia (EMUNI). At least as early as 2010, he began making numerous trips to Russia. He was a professorial teaching fellow at the University of Stirling in Scotland, as well as director of the London Academy of Diplomacy, where he served as director from 2012 until it closed in 2016. The academy was partnered with the University of Stirling. He has also served as president of the University Consortium of the Province of Agrigento in Sicily; in September 2018, an Italian court ordered him to repay the Consortium 49,000 euros ($56,700) in overpayments.

As of 2017, Mifsud was a member of the European Council on Foreign Relations (ECFR). He regularly attended meetings of the Valdai Discussion Club, an annual conference held in Russia, backed by the Kremlin and attended by Vladimir Putin. In April 2016, Mifsud spoke at a Valdai Club panel in Moscow alongside Switzerland-based lawyer Stephan Roh. Roh, who has been associated with Russian oligarchs and who owns a 5% stake in Link Campus University, has been described by George Papadopoulos's wife as Mifsud's partner, best friend, and funder.

According to the Mueller Report, released in 2019 after Mifsud's disappearance, Mifsud "maintained various Russian contacts while living in London", including an unnamed person (name redacted), who was a former staff member of the Internet Research Agency, the Russian troll farm based in Saint Petersburg. Mifsud had previously denied having any contact with the Russian government, saying "I am an academic, I do not even speak Russian."

Connection to George Papadopoulos
In March 2016, shortly after George Papadopoulos was named as a foreign policy advisor to the Trump campaign, Mifsud met Papadopoulos in Rome. They later met again in London, where – according to Papadopoulos – Mifsud claimed "substantial connections to Russian officials" and introduced Papadopoulos to a Russian woman that he falsely claimed was Putin's niece. At a meeting in April, Mifsud told Papadopoulos that he had learned that the Russian government had "dirt" on Hillary Clinton. Mifsud has acknowledged meeting Papadopoulos, but denied Papadopoulos's specific allegations. On 10 May 2016, Papadopoulos repeated the information to the Australian High Commissioner in London, Alexander Downer, who was accompanied by Australian diplomat Erika Thompson, that "the Trump team had received some kind of suggestion from Russia that it could assist this process with the anonymous release of information during the campaign that would be damaging to Mrs Clinton (and President Obama)." Downer later reported to American authorities that Papadopoulos had apparently known about Russia's theft of Democratic National Committee emails before it was publicly reported. Papadopoulos denies having told Downer this. The FBI then launched an investigation into possible connections between Russia and the Trump campaign. Mifsud was interviewed by the FBI in February 2017 while visiting the United States to speak at a conference. Mifsud left the United States on 11 February 2017.

Mifsud has been claimed to be an intelligence agent by various sources. Former FBI Director James Comey has described Mifsud as a "Russian agent". Papadopoulos and other critics of the investigation of Russian interference in the 2016 campaign, such as Republicans Jim Jordan and Devin Nunes, have suggested Mifsud might be a Western intelligence agent instructed to entrap Papadopoulos in order to justify an investigation. A December 2019 Justice Department Inspector General report found no evidence Mifsud was an FBI informant, or that his involvement with Papadopoulos was related to any FBI operation. U.S. Attorney General William Barr and U.S. prosecutor John Durham met with Italian intelligence officials in Rome in late September 2019 to learn more about Mifsud and his contacts. Italian officials denied that Italian intelligence services were involved.

Missing person
Mifsud's passport and wallet were found on 5 August 2017, in Câmara de Lobos, Portugal, although the Maltese government was not informed until in October 2019. He spoke to his girlfriend on 31 October 2017, the day before an Italian newspaper revealed that the "professor" referred to in news reports about Papadopoulos was Mifsud; as of 27 February 2018, she had not heard from him again. Photographic evidence showed that Mifsud was in Switzerland on 21 May 2018; he lived in Link Campus University housing until the summer of that year. In September 2018, an Italian court described his location as "residence unknown". According to a filing in a U.S. federal court in the case Democratic National Committee v. Russian Federation in September 2018, Mifsud was "missing and may be deceased". Mifsud's whereabouts were unknown and he could not be served with the complaint.

According to media reports, Mifsud was in Rome as of April 2019. Corriere della Sera, Italy's newspaper of record, said on 11 November 2019 that it received a recording of someone who claimed to be Mifsud. Voice recognition experts with the U.K.-based investigative journalism group Bellingcat said that, based on tone and pronunciation, the recording matched verified recordings of Mifsud.

See also
List of people who disappeared
Russian interference in the 2016 United States elections

References

External links

1960 births
2010s missing person cases
Academics of the University of Stirling
University of Malta alumni
Date of birth missing (living people)
Living people
Maltese academics
Missing people
Missing person cases in Italy
People associated with Russian interference in the 2016 United States elections
University of Padua alumni